Hristo Viktorov Garbov (Bulgarian: Христо Викторов Гърбов; born September 23, 1957) is a Bulgarian film and television actor. His career started in 1981.

Biography 
Hristo Garbov was born in Varna, Bulgaria. Hristo was a student at the Technical University in Varna and later transferred to the Krastyo Sarafov National Academy for Theatre and Film Arts. He married Iglika Trifonova.

Career 
Hristo is best known as an actor on the comedy show Comitzite on bTV. He currently acts in the series Sofia Residents in Excess.

Filmography 
Letaloto (1981) - as role of Sirachko
Orisiya (1983) 
Chernite lebedi (1984)
Stepni hora (1986) - as role of Ivan 
Sasedkata (1988)
Slyapa sabota (1988) - as role of Kosta Bikov
Ivan and Alexandra (1989)
Byagashti kucheta (1989)
Journey to Jerusalem (2003)

References 
Interview
Profile in IMDb

20th-century Bulgarian male actors
Living people
Actors from Varna, Bulgaria
Bulgarian male film actors
Bulgarian male stage actors
Bulgarian male television actors
1957 births